Cx4 may refer to:

 The Beretta Cx4 Storm, a pistol-caliber carbine
 The Cx4 chip, a math coprocessor by Capcom
 The Mazda CX-4, compact crossover vehicle
 10GBASE-CX4, a copper based 10 Gigabit Ethernet PHY
 CX 4 Radio Rural, a radio station in Uruguay